Chickenshed (also known as Chicken Shed or the Chicken Shed Theatre Company) is a British theatre company based in Southgate, London.

Chickenshed's membership programme comprises four Children's theatre groups and two Youth theatre groups for young people aged 5–21 years.  They run Saturday and holiday workshops for ages 5–12 years and performance and singing workshops for adults. They also operate education courses in inclusive performing arts at BTEC, Foundation Degree and BA (Hons) Levels.

History 
Chickenshed was founded by teacher Mary Ward and composers Jo Collins and Anthony Filby in 1974. It began in a disused chicken barn  in Barnet, which is how it came to be called Chickenshed. Mary Ward started teaching in 1966 and was struck by how much better the children she taught could be reached through drama than any other subject and those who struggled in other fields shone in an environment where the work was created to fit those taking part rather than vice versa.  Chickenshed has a purpose built theatre complex in Southgate. The theatre has four performance spaces: The Rayne Theatre which seating 300, a smaller Studio Theatre, and Amphitheatre and a Bar/restaurant that regularly hosts music and comedy evenings. They also have a branch in Kensington and Chelsea. Since 2000, Chickenshed has established 19 'Sheds' in the UK and two in Russia. These Sheds have been set up and trained by Chickenshed but then go to run independently, linked to Chickenshed by a shared vision of inclusive practice and philosophy. Chickenshed is registered as a charity under the name The Chickenshed Theatre Trust. In 1996, company founder Mary Ward was awarded the MBE for Services to the Arts followed in 1999, with a Creative Britons Award, to acknowledge her 25 years of work with the theatre, while co-founder Jo Collins was awarded the MBE in the 2001 New Year's honours, for Services to Music. Chickenshed has performed at a number of public events, including Queen Elizabeth II's golden jubilee celebrations in 2002. A show to commemorate 100 years of J. M. Barrie's children's story Peter Pan was staged by the theatre company at the Albery Theatre, London in 2004, in order to raise funds for Great Ormond Street Hospital.

Chickenshed appointed Lou Stein as its artistic director on 4 April 2016.

Music
The first musical writers for Chickenshed were Jo Collins and Anthony Filby, who together formed Colby music, through which they published a collection of musicals that Chickenshed performed. The music team has since greatly expanded.
In December 1997, Chickenshed released a single, entitled "I Am In Love With The World", performed by children from the theatre.  At bookmaker's odds of 4/1, the song was one of the contenders to become the UK Christmas number-one single. However it reached only #15 in the chart, remaining in the Top 75 for six weeks. The song was included on Diana, Princess of Wales: Tribute, a charity album recorded following the death of Diana, Princess of Wales. Diana had been the royal patron of the theatre along with Dame Judi Dench, who is also a great supporter, and it was one of her favorite charities.

Late 2003 saw the release of The Chicken Shed Album, a compilation that marked the 30th anniversary of the theatre company. Contributors to the album included supporters of the organisation, such as Cliff Richard, Emma Bunton, Bob Hoskins and Kenneth Branagh, as well as three tracks by Chicken Shed itself. Jo Collins & Chickenshed recorded a song, "Talk Through Me" for the 2007 show tunes album Over the Rainbow, in aid of The Association of Children's Hospices.

Discography

"Have A Heart At Christmas" (single, 1994)

 "Have A Heart At Christmas"
 "Rhapsody In Blue" (featuring Larry Adler)
 "I'll Build A Stairway To Paradise" (featuring Larry Adler & Issy van Randwyck)

"I Am In Love With The World" (single, 1997)

 "I Am In Love With the World"
 "Don't Know If I Believe In Christmas"
 "Little Tommy"
 "Chicken Menace"

The Chicken Shed Album (album, 2003)

 "Watch Me Come Alive" - Cliff Richard
 "As Far as the Eye Can See" - Gabrielle
 "I Am In Love With the World" - Chicken Shed
 "Sometimes" - Emma Bunton
 "The Wedding Dance" - Dmitry Sitkovetsky
 "Can I Love Him?" - Sam Brown
 "Bits and Pieces" - Bob Hoskins
 "Trail My Soul" - Chicken Shed
 "Looking For Love" - Richard O'Brien
 "Will It Happen To Me?" - Barbara Dickson
 "Elijah" - Kenneth Branagh
 "First Love" - Chicken Shed
 "Mad Little Sad Boy" - Kenneth Branagh
 "Still Waters" - Misty Oldland
 "We Need Each Other" - Elaine Paige
 "Dream a We Real Yew" - Kenneth Branagh

References

External links
 Chickenshed website

Disability theatre
Children's theatre
Theatre companies in the United Kingdom
Charities for disabled people based in the United Kingdom
Children's charities based in the United Kingdom
Educational charities based in the United Kingdom
1974 establishments in the United Kingdom
Charities based in London
Organizations established in 1974
Cockfosters
Theatres in the London Borough of Enfield